Figueroa is one of the forty subbarrios of Santurce, San Juan, Puerto Rico.

Demographics
In 2000, Figueroa had a population of 1,016.

In 2010, Figueroa had a population of 698 and a population density of 4,985.7 persons per square mile.

See also 
 
 List of communities in Puerto Rico

References

Santurce, San Juan, Puerto Rico
Municipality of San Juan